Franciel Rodrigo Hengemühle, known as just Franciel (born 17 February 1982) is a Brazilian footballer.

Career
Franciel started his career at Grêmio, one of the biggest clubs from Rio Grande do Sul state, where he was born. In July 2002, along with Matheus Coradini Vivian, he was signed by Eintracht Frankfurt. He played once for the first team before he left for 1. FC Eschborn and later for Swiss Super League club Schaffhausen.

In the 2005–06 season, he left for Debreceni. But in January 2006, Franciel returned to Brazil for Brasil de Pelotas, a team from Rio Grande do Sul state, for the state league. On 1 May 2006, he was signed by Sport Club Ulbra in a one-year deal. However, he was released on 1 August 2006 due to court order. He re-joined Brasil de Pelotas on 5 September 2006 and joined São José de Porto Alegre in January 2007.

In September 2007, Franciel returned to Europe for Italian fourth division side Gela.

After stints with now defunct club Valle del Giovenco and a return to Gela, Franciel signed with L'Aquila in January 2011.

In about January 2012, Franciel returned to Brazil again, for São José of Porto Alegre city. He scored four goals in first half of the state league (Taça Piratini). He was released in April. In May, he was signed by Mogi Mirim in a one-year deal. The team was one of the representative for the São Paulo state in 2012 Campeonato Brasileiro Série D, a final stage for the state (regional) leagues.

References

External links
 
 Franciel at Football.it 

1982 births
Living people
Brazilian footballers
Brazilian expatriate footballers
Grêmio Foot-Ball Porto Alegrense players
Eintracht Frankfurt players
Eintracht Frankfurt II players
FC Schaffhausen players
Debreceni VSC players
Grêmio Esportivo Brasil players
S.S.D. Città di Gela players
L'Aquila Calcio 1927 players
Mogi Mirim Esporte Clube players
Expatriate footballers in Germany
Expatriate footballers in Switzerland
Expatriate footballers in Italy
Swiss Super League players
2. Bundesliga players
Sportspeople from Rio Grande do Sul
Association football forwards
Brazilian people of German descent